Beatrice of Béziers was the second wife of Raymond VI of Toulouse. Together they had one daughter, Constance of Toulouse. Beatrice was repudiated in 1189 and she retired to a Cathar nunnery. It was said she became a Cathar parfaite.

References

Sources

Catharism
12th-century French people
12th-century French women